Fernando Eusebio (born August 23, 1910 in Rimini) was an Italian professional football player.

He played 6 seasons (53 games, 18 goals) in the Serie A for A.S. Roma. He scored 3 goals in the Derby della Capitale games against S.S. Lazio.

1910 births
Year of death missing
Italian footballers
Serie A players
A.S. Roma players
U.S. Pistoiese 1921 players
Association football forwards